Durazzano is a comune (municipality) in the Province of Benevento in the Italian region Campania, located about 30 km northeast of Naples and about 30 km west of Benevento. As of 1 January 2020, it had a population of 2,171 and an area of 13.2 km2.

Durazzano borders the following municipalities: Cervino, Sant'Agata de' Goti, Santa Maria a Vico, Valle di Maddaloni.

Demographic evolution

References

Cities and towns in Campania